The Kosovo Judicial Council (KJC) is the national council of the judiciary of Kosovo. It is the oversight body that aims to ensure the independence and impartiality of the judicial system, and the administration of justice in Kosovo.

The Kosovo Judicial Council is the highest oversight body of the Kosovo Judicial System and an independent institution, and its main responsibility is the administration of the entire Judicial System. The overall purpose of Kosovo Judicial Council, as mandated by the applicable legal framework is to ensure an independent, fair, apolitical, accessible, professional and impartial judicial system, which reflects the multi-ethnic nature of Kosovo as well as the internationally recognized principles of human rights and gender equality.

To fulfill this goal Kosovo Judicial Council is responsible for selecting and proposing judges for appointment, as well as for elaborating policies for the overall management and reform of the judicial system. Kosovo Judicial Council is the institution, which evaluates disciplines and promotes the sitting judges and lay judges. Furthermore, the Kosovo Judicial Council is responsible for the overall management and administration of all courts, for the elaboration and the implementation of the budget of the judiciary and for the establishment of new courts and court branches.

Responsibilities 
According to the Constitution of Kosovo, the Kosovo Judicial Council:

See also 
 Judiciary of Kosovo
 Constitution of Kosovo
 Constitutional Court of Kosovo

Notes

References

Law of Kosovo
Judiciary of Kosovo
National councils of the judiciary